Nikola Zvrko (Serbian Cyrillic: Никола Зврко; born 7 March 1995) is a Montenegrin professional footballer who plays for Petrovac, as a striker.

External links
 
 Profile and stats at Srbijafudbal

1995 births
Living people
Footballers from Podgorica
Association football forwards
Montenegrin footballers
FK Čukarički players
FK Kom players
FK Sinđelić Beograd players
FK Mladost Lučani players
OFK Bačka players
FK Iskra Danilovgrad players
FK Podgorica players
OFK Petrovac players
Serbian First League players
Serbian SuperLiga players
Montenegrin First League players
Montenegrin expatriate footballers
Montenegrin expatriate sportspeople in Serbia
Expatriate footballers in Serbia